The Mining Industry Human Resources Council (MiHR) is  a not-for-profit organization that drives collaboration among mining and exploration companies, organized labour, contractors, educational institutions, industry associations and Indigenous groups to identify opportunities and address the human resource and labour market challenges facing the Canadian minerals and metals sector. MiHR contributes to the sustainability of the Canadian mining sector by collaborating with its stakeholders and communities of interest, to develop solutions tailored to human resources needs in the mining sector. Its vision is to build a diverse, sustainable, safe and skilled Canadian Mining workforce that is recognized globally.

Background

In 1994, the Canadian Federal Government's Whitehorse Mining Initiative (WMI) recommended the establishment of a mining industry council to address sector-wide human resources issues.

In response to the WMI's request, the Mining Industry Training and Adjustment Council (MITAC) was established in November 1996, through the combined efforts of the Mining Association of Canada (MAC) and three major unions in the mining sector: The United Steelworkers of America, the Communication, Energy and Paperworkers Union of Canada and the Canadian Autoworkers Union.

MITAC's goal was to enable Canadian mining companies, unions and employees to collaborate to improve the quality, cost-effectiveness and availability of training, and to maximize the skills, adaptability and employability of the workers in the minerals and metals sector. Its activities were funded by Human Resources and Skills Development Canada (HRSDC).

After the HRSDC halted funding MITAC's training development initiatives and Youth  Opportunities Program in early 2002, they commissioned the council to undertake a sector study, titled "Prospecting the Future - Meeting Human Resources Challenges in the Canadian Minerals and Metals Industry". Its 2005 release highlighted the ongoing need for MITAC's expertise in addressing HR challenges facing the mining industry. In particular, the study noted that the industry had to make better use of all potential sources of employment, including youth, women, Indigenous people and new Canadians. It also highlighted the need to ensure a skilled workforce.

With the study's findings, MITAC undertook a strategic planning process resulting in a new mandate and future direction and function. Effective February 2006, The Mining Industry Training and Adjustment Council (MITAC) was renamed the Mining Industry Human Resources Council (MiHR).

Services 
MiHR conducts research into Canada's mining labour market with the objective of uncovering the important HR trends relevant to the industry. This research forms the cornerstone of the programs MiHR undertakes to identify opportunities and address the human resource and labour market challenges within the Canadian minerals and metals sector. They also offer custom research reports for those interested in topics not covered by their standard reports.

To help fill openings and generate new jobs for the Canadian minerals and metals mining industry, MiHR runs a variety of programs such as its Gearing Up and Green Jobs wage subsidy programs, an online Mining Career Quiz, and provides information on its website.

Programs and Initiatives

Gearing Up 
Announced in April 2018, Gearing Up is a work-integrated learning (WIL) program for Canada's mining sector. It aims to create 850 new WIL opportunities in mining over four years. Wage subsidies up to $7,000 are available to employers who create new WIL opportunities, such as co ops, internships, field placements, applied projects, capstone projects or case competitions.

MiHR works with a national consortium of mining employers, industry associations and post-secondary institutions to implement program activities and inform how industry and education can work together collaboratively to develop WIL opportunities.

The Green Jobs Program 
MiHR's Green Jobs wage subsidy program aims to strengthen the mining industry labour market by helping post-secondary graduates gain relevant and meaningful work experience in mining through paid internships. Its objective is to provide 120 meaningful internship opportunities in the mining sector related to science, technology, engineering and math. Jobs with a focus on clean technology and innovation that provide an environmental benefit to Canada are eligible for a wage subsidy of up to $12,000.

Gender Equity in Mining (GEM) Works 
GEM Works is a 12-month, comprehensive training program that builds networks of 10 like-minded mining companies or sites who collaborate to learn from one another, share successes and challenges, and offer mutual support to remove unintentional barriers to gender inclusion. It aims to help companies foster a mining and minerals industry where both women and men have the best opportunities for making great contributions and rewarding careers.

The Canadian Mining Certification Program (CMCP) 

The CMCP intends to measure and certify expertise in mining, validating the skills, knowledge, and experience of workers in the mining sector. CMCP is the first - and only - national mining worker certification program in Canada.

CMCP recognizes individual mine workers who have demonstrated their competency and expertise by meeting the National Occupational Standards (NOS) established for the Canadian mining industry. They establish clear, objective skill and knowledge benchmarks, and form the basis for workplace development, driving curriculum development within educational institutes, and the alignment of company training programs.

Mining Essentials 
Mining Essentials is a pre-employment training program for Indigenous peoples who are interested in exploring career options in mining. The program teaches both the essential skills and work readiness skills that the Canadian mining industry has deemed necessary to gain an entry-level position. It is being expanded as part of the National Essential and Work Readiness (NEWR) Skills Training Program for the mining industry to better represent youth, women and immigrants.

ENSEMBLE 
ENSEMBLE, subtitled The Mining Industry Diversity Network, is an online meeting place that provides Human Resources, diversity and recruiting professionals from Canada's mining industry a space to connect with diversity-focused associations, Indigenous mining and community experts, and immigrant employment counselors to find ways to promote diversity and inclusion in mining. MiHR uses this platform to host monthly webinars based on a variety of diversity-based topics.

Immigrant Outreach 
The Mining Specific Professional Immigrant Networks (M-PIN) project is the key arm of MiHR's immigrant outreach programs. In collaboration with the Toronto Region Immigrant Council (TRIEC) and Professions North/Nord in Sudbury, M-PIN aims to adapt, test and evaluate innovative methods to broaden engagement to better recruit and integrate immigrant talent into the Ontario mining industry.

Notes

Mining in Canada